The 1997 Coca-Cola 600, the 38th running of the event, was a NASCAR Winston Cup Series race held on May 25, 1997 at Charlotte Motor Speedway in Charlotte, North Carolina. Contested at 333 laps  – shortened from 400 laps due to a rain delay and a 1 a.m. curfew – on the 1.5 mile (2.4 km) speedway, it was the 11th race of the 1997 NASCAR Winston Cup Series season. Jeff Gordon of Hendrick Motorsports won the race.

On the day of the race, 0.25 inches of precipitation were recorded around the speedway.

Background
Charlotte Motor Speedway is a motorsports complex located in Concord, North Carolina, United States 13 miles from Charlotte, North Carolina. The complex features a 1.5 miles (2.4 km) quad oval track that hosts NASCAR racing including the prestigious Coca-Cola 600 on Memorial Day weekend and The Winston, as well as the UAW-GM Quality 500. The speedway was built in 1959 by Bruton Smith and is considered the home track for NASCAR with many race teams located in the Charlotte area. The track is owned and operated by Speedway Motorsports Inc. (SMI).

Top 10 results

Race statistics
 Time of race: 3:39:10
 Average Speed: 
 Pole Speed: 184.3
 Cautions: 7 for 50 laps
 Margin of Victory: 0.468 sec
 Lead changes: 27
 Percent of race run under caution: 15%         
 Average green flag run: 35.4 laps

References

Coca-Cola 600
Coca-Cola 600
NASCAR races at Charlotte Motor Speedway